Zygmunt Edward "Ziggy" Switkowski,  (born 1948), is a Polish Australian business executive and nuclear physicist. His most public role was as the chief executive officer of Australia's largest telecommunications company Telstra from 1999 to 2004. During his tenure, he oversaw the privatisation of the then government-owned corporation through a series of public tranche sales (known as the T1, T2 and T3 sales). Currently, he is the chairman of both NBN Co and Suncorp, a director of Healthscope, Oil Search and Tabcorp and the Chancellor of the Royal Melbourne Institute of Technology (RMIT University).

Early life
Switkowski was born in Germany in 1948 to Polish parents. His family migrated to Australia when he was one year old and settled in Melbourne. He attended St Bernard's College in Essendon (a suburb of Melbourne), and earned a bachelor's degree in science and a doctorate in nuclear physics (at 24 years old) from the University of Melbourne. He then completed six years of postdoctoral research following his doctorate.

Career

Communications
Before his tenure at Telstra, Switkowski was chief executive officer of Australia's second largest telecommunications company Optus and the photographic equipment company Kodak (Australasia). He also served as chairman and managing director of Kodak (Australasia) from 1992 to 1996. During this time, he served as a non-executive director of the multinational packaging company Amcor from 1995 to 1999.

In 1995, Switkowski received the Advance Australia Award for outstanding achievement in industry and commerce.

Telstra
On 1 March 1999, Switkowski was appointed chief executive officer of Australia's public and largest telecommunications company Telstra, and to the board of directors of Telstra's pay television partner Foxtel. Before his appointment, he was group managing director of Telstra's Business and International Development division.

During his tenure at Telstra, Switkowski oversaw the introduction of a number of services to the company; such as its major internet service provider subsidiary BigPond, and substantial expansion of others; such as its advertising and directories subsidiary Pacific Access (later re-branded as Sensis in 2002).

Switkowski oversaw the implementation of the second tranche sale of Telstra (the 'T2' sale) on the Australian Stock Exchange, New Zealand Stock Exchange and New York Stock Exchange that began in September 1999. The first tranche sale of Telstra (the 'T1' sale) took place before Switkowski was appointed CEO of Telstra. He also oversaw the planning for the third tranche sale of Telstra (the 'T3' sale).

Switkowski resigned from Telstra on 3 December 2004, and was replaced by Solomon Trujillo.

NBN
On 3 October 2013, Switkowski was confirmed as the new chairman and interim CEO of NBN Co by Communications Minister Malcolm Turnbull, and reverted to the role of Non-Executive Chairman from 2 April 2014 following the appointment of Bill Morrow as chief executive officer. This followed a decision to deliver the NBN with 'alternative technologies' such as Fibre to the node and the use of a Multi-Technology Mix (MTM).

Nuclear research
On 6 June 2006, Switkowski was appointed to chair a Commonwealth Government inquiry into the viability of a domestic nuclear power industry. He was later appointed chairman of the Australian Nuclear Science and Technology Organisation (ANSTO) by federal Minister for Science Julie Bishop on 4 March 2007. Switkowski was originally appointed to the board of ANSTO on 1 January 2006, but stood down when appointed to the inquiry. After the completion of the inquiry, he was then reappointed to the board as chairman on 1 March 2007. His term as chairman concluded at the end of 2010.

The inquiry concluded that Australia is well positioned to increase its production and export of uranium as well as adding nuclear power to its own energy mix. However, an independent panel of Australian scientists and nuclear experts have been critical of these findings, claiming that they relied upon flawed assumptions while dodging important questions such as the disposal of radioactive waste and the potential greenhouse gas implications of increased mining.

Other directorships
On 19 September 2005, Switkowski took a non-executive director role with Suncorp-Metway – his first position after resigning from Telstra. Since then he has become the chairman as of the 2011 Annual General Meeting.

In 2006, Switkowski was appointed president of the board of directors of the Australian Centre for the Moving Image on 1 January – for a three-year term. He also took non-executive director roles with Healthscope on 19 January, and with Tabcorp Holdings on 2 October.

In 2011 Switkowski was serving as a director of Rare Earth's miner Lynas Corporation as per the director's Share Purchase Notice.

Switkowski also currently serves as chairman of Opera Australia and on the board of directors of the Business Council of Australia.

Switkowski currently serves on the Board of Oilsearch.

In August 2021, Switkowski was appointed as Chairman of Crown Resorts, Australia's largest gambling, gaming and entertainment company.

RMIT
On 27 October 2010, it was announced that Switkowski would become the Chancellor of the Royal Melbourne Institute of Technology (RMIT University). He was officially appointed to the position on 1 January 2011. On 7 September 2021, Switkowsi announced that he would step down from the position of Chancellor of RMIT by the end of October 2021, two weeks after he was appointed as Chairman of Crown Resorts.

Honours
In the 2014 Queen's Birthday Honours List, Switkowski was appointed as an Officer of the Order of Australia (AO), for "distinguished service to the community, particularly to tertiary education administration, scientific organisations and the telecommunications sector, to business, and to the arts".

Switkowski is a Fellow of the Australian Institute of Company Directors (FAICD) and also of the Australian Academy of Technological Sciences and Engineering (FTSE). In 2015 he was elected Fellow of the Australian Academy of Science (FAA).

Personal life
Switkowski is married and lives with his wife near Cape Schanck, on Melbourne's Mornington Peninsula.

References

External links
 Ziggy goes nuclear – ABC Interview
 Ziggy Switkowksi Interview – CEO Forum Group
 Greens slam Ziggy's Tas nuclear vision
 'Ex-Telstra chief to head nuclear review' ABC News, 6 June 2006
 'Nuclear costs understated: report's critics' Sydney Morning Herald, 22 November 2006
 'Peer review panel says Switkowksi's nuclear timeframe is unrealistic' The World Today – Tuesday, 12 December 2006  12:29:00
 Switkowski appointed ANSTO chairman, ABC News Online 4 March 2007

1948 births
Living people
Australian people of Polish descent
People educated at St. Bernard's College, Melbourne
University of Melbourne alumni
Fellows of the Australian Academy of Technological Sciences and Engineering
Fellows of the Australian Academy of Science
Australian chief executives
Telstra people
NBN Co people
Chancellors of RMIT University
Officers of the Order of Australia
Fellows of the Australian Institute of Company Directors
Scientists from Melbourne
Businesspeople from Melbourne